The Muonio is a river in northern Finland and Sweden. It is a tributary of the Tornio. Together the two rivers form the national border between Finland and Sweden. The river is 230 kilometres long.

References

External links

Rivers of Finland
Rivers of Norrbotten County
International rivers of Europe
Border rivers
Torne river basin
Finland–Sweden border
Rivers of Enontekiö